Giuseppe Ferrari (1840–1905) was an Italian painter.

Biography 

After academic studies at Accademia di San Luca in Rome under the tutelage of Alessandro Marini, he travelled through Africa and the Middle East, where he found strong suggestions and inspiration for several landscape paintings of those years. In 1877 he moved to London, where he studied the art of painters as John Constable and William Turner. Ferrari's pupils included Lillie Logan.

Artistic production 

Ferrari is considered one of the most important Italian landscape painters of his time. In particular, he used to portray the campagna romana, insomuch as founded with other painters, among which Enrico Coleman and Cesare Pascarella, the group "XXV della campagna romana". In the last years of his life he dedicated to portraits as well.

Exhibits 

In 1877 and in 1883 he exhibited at the Royal Academy of Arts in London. Ferrari participated at the first Venice Biennale in 1895, but also in those held in 1905 and 1922 (posthumous participation).

Paintings in museums 

Rieti, civic museum;
Rome, Galleria Nazionale d'Arte Moderna;
Milan, Modern Art Gallery.

Ferrari, with Coleman, also realized the frescos for Villa Durante in Rome in 1891.

References

Bibliography
M. C. Cola, Giuseppe Ferrari, in Dizionario biografico degli Italiani Treccani, volume 46, 1996.

1840 births
1905 deaths
Italian landscape painters
19th-century Italian painters
19th-century Italian male artists
Italian male painters
20th-century Italian painters
Orientalist painters
20th-century Italian male artists